Reddy Row, (born Venkata Row, also known as Reddy Royar), was an Indian administrator who served as the Diwan of Travancore from 1817 to 1821 and 1843 to 1845.

Early life 

Reddy Row was born in a Thanjavur Marathi Deshastha Madhva Brahmin family at Kumbakonam. When John Munroe became the Diwan of Travancore in 1811, Reddy Row joined the Travancore service as accountant and helped reorganise the Accounts Department of the kingdom.

Diwan of Travancore 

Reddy Row became the Diwan of Travancore in September 1817. He was a protégé of John Munroe and worked on his behalf to introduce reforms. Soon after taking over, Reddy Row passed royal proclamations relieving Christians from compulsory donations towards Hindu ceremonies and exempting them from working on Sundays.He also removed restrictions on low-caste Hindus from wearing gold and silver ornaments and jewellery and introduced coffee cultivation and vaccination. However, when the princess Rukmini Bayi married in 1820, Reddy Row made lavish arrangements for the wedding and was given the villages of Shambhur and Vadakar in Shencottah taluk by the Rani in return. This scandalised the Travancore court and Venkata Rao complained about the Diwan to the new resident Col. Newall thereby forcing him to resign.

When Subha Rao resigned as Diwan in 1843, his protégé Krishna Row was made Acting Diwan. He was supported by the British resident at Travancore. But as the Maharaja was not satisfied with him, he expressed his opinion on Krishna Row to the Governor of Madras who instructed the appointment of Reddy Row as Diwan once again to the chagrin of the Resident. 
 
Reddy Row served his second term as Diwan from 1843 to 1845. This period was characterized by increasing bitterness between the Maharaja and the Resident. In 1845, General Cullen allegedly engineered the downfall of the Diwan by charging him with receiving bribes and presents. An inquiry was launched in the Diwan's conduct and he was compelled to resign.

Notes

References

 

Diwans of Travancore